(English: Black Peoples/African Peoples) was a bimonthly African political periodical that ran from 1978 to 1991. The first issue was published in Cameroon in January/February 1978. It was created by  Mongo Beti and his spouse Odile Tobner, who fought for human rights for political prisoners in Francophone Africa, and especially in Cameroon.

Quoted from the first issue from January/February 1978 (translated from French):

See also 

Françafrique

References

External links 

Magazines established in 1978
Magazines published in Africa
Defunct political magazines
Magazines disestablished in 1991
French-language magazines
Bi-monthly magazines